Hansjörg Sumi (born 19 January 1959) is a Swiss former ski jumper.

Career
He finished seventh in the individual large hill event at the 1980 Winter Olympics in Lake Placid, New York. Sumi's only career victory was in an individual large hill event in Switzerland in 1980.

World Cup

Standings

Wins

External links

Ski jumpers at the 1980 Winter Olympics
Ski jumpers at the 1984 Winter Olympics
Olympic ski jumpers of Switzerland
Living people
Swiss male ski jumpers
1959 births